Alfred Michael Watson (July 11, 1908 – January 4, 1990) was an American prelate of the Roman Catholic Church who served as the seventh bishop of the 
Diocese of Erie, Pennsylvania (1969–1982).

Biography
Watson was born in Erie, Pennsylvania, and ordained a priest on May 10, 1934. On May 17, 1965, he was appointed Auxiliary Bishop of Erie and Titular Bishop of Nationa by Pope Paul VI. He received his episcopal consecration on the following June 29 from Cardinal John Krol, with Bishop John Selby Spence and Joseph Francis Donnelly serving as co-consecrators. Watson attended Cathedral Preparatory School.

Following the promotion of John Francis Whealon to Archbishop of Hartford in 1968, Watson was named Bishop of Erie on March 17, 1969. He was accused of being too slow to implement the reforms of the Second Vatican Council, and met considerable opposition from the diocesan clergy. During his tenure, he ordained 88 priests, but was forced to close or merge several Catholic schools.

After breaking his hip and undergoing surgery, he retired on July 16, 1982. He died 9 years later at age 81.

References

1908 births
1990 deaths
Roman Catholic bishops of Erie
Participants in the Second Vatican Council
20th-century Roman Catholic bishops in the United States